The Ice Cube Curling Center is a 3,000-seat multi-purpose arena in Sochi, Russia, that opened in 2012. It is a component of the Sochi Olympic Park.

It hosted all the curling events at the 2014 Winter Olympics and the wheelchair curling events at the 2014 Winter Paralympics.  It cost $14.0 million to build the venue, including the temporary works for the Olympics and Paralympics. It opened in 2012.  After the 2014 games, it will remain a sports arena. The venue is a portable venue, designed  so that it could possibly be re-located after the end of the games.

See also
 List of indoor arenas in Russia

References

External links

 Venue Models from Sochi Investment Forum 2009
 Curling Arena Information and images
 Arena information and drawings
 Sochi2014.com profile

Indoor arenas in Russia
Sports venues in Russia
Sport in Sochi
Venues of the 2014 Winter Olympics
Olympic curling venues
Adlersky City District
Curling venues in Russia
Buildings and structures in Sochi